Natalie Morales may refer to:
 Natalie Morales (journalist) (born 1972), American journalist
 Natalie Morales (actress) (born 1985), American actress